Alp Ekici (born 2000), better known by his stage name Baneva, is a Turkish rapper and songwriter.

Discography

Albums
 MANIFESTOR (2021)

Singles and EPs
 İhtiyacım Var (2018)
 Yok (2018)
  Yükseklere (2019) (with Tankurt Manas)
 Kabullen Artık (2019)
 İstiyorum (2019)
 Peşindeyim (2019)
 Hiçbiri (2020)
 Her Baktığımda (2021)
 UNNAMED V1 (2021)  (EP) 
 Güneşim (with Ezgi Alaş ile) (2021)

References 

Turkish rappers
Living people
2000 births
Turkish lyricists
21st-century Turkish male singers
21st-century Turkish singers
Turkish singer-songwriters